Charlotte Gouffier de Boisy, Madame de Cossé-Brissac (born 1482) was a French noblewoman and courtier who served as the Governess of the Children of France.

Biography 
Gouffier de Boisy was born in 1482 to Guillaume Gouffier, Lord of Boisy and Philippa de Montmorency. She was a sister of Artus Gouffier, Lord of Boissy, Adrian Gouffier de Boissy, and Guillaume Gouffier, seigneur de Bonnivet. She was a first cousin of Anne de Montmorency.

In 1503 she married Rene de Cossé, Lord of Cossé and Brissac. She was the mother of Charles de Cossé, Count of Brissac and the grandmother of Charles II de Cossé, Duke of Brissac.

In 1518 she was appointed as the Governess of the Children of France, a post previously held by Guillemette de Sarrebruck. As royal governess she was in charge of the education of the children of Francis I of France.

References 

1482 births
Year of death unknown
15th-century French women
15th-century French people
Governesses to the Children of France
Medieval French nobility
Court of Francis I of France